Tarabganj is a constituency of the Uttar Pradesh Legislative Assembly covering the city of Tarabganj in the Gonda district of Uttar Pradesh, India. It is one of five assembly constituencies in the Kaiserganj Lok Sabha constituency. Since 2008, this assembly constituency is numbered 299 amongst 403 constituencies.

Election results

2022

2017
Bharatiya Janata Party (BJP) member Prem Narayan Pandey is the MLA who won in the 2017 Uttar Pradesh Legislative Assembly election defeating Samajwadi Party candidate Vinod Kumar by a margin of 38,442 votes.

References

External links
 

Assembly constituencies of Uttar Pradesh